The Cat's Meow is a lost 1924 American silent comedy short film directed by Roy Del Ruth and starring Harry Langdon. It was distributed through the Pathé Exchange company.

Cast
Harry Langdon -
Alice Day as Ida Downe
Kalla Pasha as Bull Dakota
Lucille Thorndyke as Mrs. Downe, Ida's Mother
Bud Ross as Mr. Downe, Ida's Father
Tiny Ward as Downe's Butler
Madeline Hurlock as The Butler's Wife
Cecille Evans as Apache Dancer
Louise Carver as Anti-Slum Committee Woman
Marvin Loback as Bartender

References

External links

Lobby poster and image

1924 films
American silent short films
American black-and-white films
Films directed by Roy Del Ruth
Lost American films
1924 comedy films
Silent American comedy films
1924 lost films
Lost comedy films
1920s American films
1920s English-language films